Sredets is a district located in the very centre of the capital Sofia.  it has 41,000 inhabitants. The district has an area of around 300 hectares or 3 km2.

Its borders follow Sitnyakovo Boulevard, Yavorov Alley to the east; Dragan Tsankov Boulevard, Evlogi Georgiev Boulevard to the south and south-west; Fridtjof Nansen Street, Vitosha Boulevard to the west; Dondukov Boulevard, Moskovska Str, Shipka Str, Khan Omurtag Str to the north.

There are many green spaces and gardens. Sredets also includes the northernmost parts of Borisova gradina Park. Two of the most emblematic football stadiums in Bulgaria are located among the pleasant alleys of the park: Vasil Levski National Stadium where the Bulgaria national football team plays its home matches and the venue of Bulgaria's most successful football team CSKA Sofia, Balgarska Armiya Stadium.

There are 7 schools and 4 kindergartens.

Culture 

The district occupies some areas of the ancient city. There are extensive remains of the Roman town under the contemporary edifices and many more have been excavated during different construction works. Remains of the city walls and towers can be observed in some underpasses as well as one of the oldest churches in the Balkan Peninsula, Sv. Georgi in the yard of the Ministry of Education.

Major Landmarks:
National Assembly
National Museum of Natural History
National Art Gallery
Sofia Art Gallery
Sofia University
Ivan Vazov National Theatre
Theatre of the Army
Theatre of Satire
"Tear and laugh" Theatre
Youth Theatre
Theatre 199
Bulgaria Hall
Monument to the Tsar Liberator
Grand Hotel Sofia
Churches
Sv. Georgi
St Nedelya Church
Sveti Sedmochislenitsi Church
Russian Church

References

Districts of Sofia